Lodderena emeryi is a species of sea snail, a marine gastropod mollusk in the family Skeneidae.

Distribution
This species occurs in the Pacific Ocean off Hawaii.

References

External links
 To World Register of Marine Species

emeryi
Gastropods described in 1966